Kalaleh Eslami (also Romanized as Kalāleh Eslāmī; also known as Kalāleh, Kalla, Kelyaga, Qeshlāq, and Qishlāq) is a village in Dizmar-e Sharqi Rural District, Minjavan District, Khoda Afarin County, East Azerbaijan Province, Iran. At the 2006 census, its population was 243, in 60 families.

References 

Populated places in Khoda Afarin County